The Romance of Betty Boop is a CBS animated television special featuring Betty Boop that aired on March 20, 1985. The half-hour special was rebroadcast on CBS in December 1987.

Plot summary
The story is set in New York City in 1939, during the Great Depression. The film opens with a New York montage, as a voiceover in mock period style introduces the story of "a romantic hardworking New Yorker, an independent girl who wants nothing more than to put her feet up and marry a handsome millionaire." Desirée Goyette sings "Just Give 'Em Your Boop-Oop-a-Doop" over the opening credits. Scraps of popular songs, especially "I Only Have Eyes for You", appear throughout the film.

Betty Boop is a girl who is adored by her neighborhood and courted by Freddie the iceman, but who dreams of moving in high society and achieving "personal greatness". Betty sells shoes by day and performs at Club Bubbles by night. Uncle Mischa Bubble, the Russian owner of the club, is threatened by mob boss Johnny Throat and his two henchmen because he cannot pay his debts. Seeing Betty perform on the stage, Throat decides to take over the club to force Betty to go out with him.

Betty sings "I Wanna Be Loved By You" to attract the attention of Waldo Van Lavish, a millionaire playboy. Betty goes on a date with Waldo, during which he says he wants Betty to meet his parents, so she believes he wants to marry her. Later, on her way to meet him, Betty is kidnapped by Throat's henchmen and taken to his apartment. Uncle Mischa calls Freddie to rescue Betty, but Betty escapes on her own. She meets Waldo's aged parents and discovers that Waldo merely wants her to be a maid in his parents' house. At the end, Betty apologizes to Freddie for ignoring him and gives him a kiss. To Freddie's dismay, however, she then gets a call from Hollywood to do a screen test.

Cast
Desirée Goyette as Betty Boop
Marsha Meyers as Beverly
John Stephenson as the Announcer
Sandy Kenyon as Uncle Mischa Bubbles
Sean Allan as Freddie
Frank W. Buxton as the Parrot
Derek McGrath as Waldo Van Lavish
Robert Towers as Chuckles
George R. Wendt as Johnny Throat and Punchie
Ron Friedman as Ethnic Voices

Soundtrack 
"Just Give 'Em Your Boop-Oop-A-Doop"
Sung by Desiree Goyette
"Independent Girl"
Sung by Desiree Goyette
"Bei Mir Bist Du Shein"
Sung by Ron Friedman
"I Can't Give You Anything But Love"''
Sung by Desiree Goyette"I Wanna Be Loved by You"Sung by Desirée Goyette"I Only Have Eyes for You"'''
Sung by Desirée Goyette and Sean Allan

References

External links

The Romance of Betty Boop at Bcdb

1985 animated films
1985 films
1985 in American television
1985 television specials
Betty Boop cartoons
CBS television specials
Television shows directed by Bill Melendez
Films set in 1939
Films set in New York (state)
1980s American animated films
1980s animated short films
Films with screenplays by Ron Friedman
1980s English-language films